The Silent Boy is a 2003 book written by Lois Lowry. Categorized as both a young adult novel and historical fiction, The Silent Boy is set in a 20th-century farm community.  The story was inspired by a pile of photos that Lowry found and which are interspersed throughout the narrative. The story is told by Katy Thatcher, the young daughter of a small-town physician whose heart is softened by a local boy with a mental condition disabling him from speaking.

In 2008, Greg Gunning adapted Lois Lowry's novel into a play The Silent Boy.  The play was produced by ArtsPower National Touring Theatre, and in September 2008 through May 2009, toured the U.S.  The original cast included David Beck as Jacob, Kristen Johnson as Katy, Andrew Dawson as Dr. Thatcher, and Mary C. McLellan as Peggy.  In January 2009, Ashleigh Catsos replaced Johnson as Katy Thatcher.  The production was very well received by both students and adults.

American historical novels
2003 American novels
American young adult novels
Novels by Lois Lowry